Tehran Metro Line 1, coloured red on system maps runs north-south and is  of which  is underground (from Tajrish station to Shush Station) and the rest at grade (at surface level). The number of stations along this line is 29 of which 22 stations are underground and 7 above. , the line's total capacity is 650,000 passengers per day and trains make a scheduled stop of 20 seconds per station. The trains are made up of seven wagons, giving a nominal capacity of 1,300 seated and standing passengers.

Line 1 runs mostly north-south, and the southern terminus has interchange platforms for its extension sometimes termed Metro Line 8, to Imam Khomeini International Airport completed in August 2017. Construction was to be completed by March 2007 but faced major issues due to large boulders and rock bed in part of the tunnels as well as water ingress/drainage issues. It also faced major financing issues as the government refused to release funds earmarked for the project to the municipality.

Route
It runs briefly more westward along Mirdamad Boulevard. After passing through Mirdamad Station, it resumes its normal axis, reaching Beheshti Station where it intersects with Line 3. It mirrors the course of Dr. Mofatteh Street and after intersecting with Line 4 at Darvazeh Dowlat Station, on Sa'adi Street it rapidly intersects with Line 2 at Imam Khomeini Station at Toopkhaneh. It again shifts briefly southwest along Khayyam Street. Past Shush Station, the line surfaces and continues south, passing through Rey, and Behesht-e Zahra, Kahrizak, reaching Shahr-e Aftab Metro Station at Shahed - Bagher Shahr Metro Station.

Tehran Metro Line 8
Since 2017 the  extension from further platforms at Shahed - Bagher Shahr Station via Shahr-e-Aftab Station heads to 	Imam Khomeini Airport. It was opened in August 2017.

References 

Tehran Metro
Railway lines opened in 2001